RTV Maglaj or Televizija Maglaj is a Bosnian local commercial television channel based in Maglaj. The program is produced in Bosnian language 20 hours per day. Local radio station Radio Maglaj is also part of this company.

External links 
 
 Communications Regulatory Agency of Bosnia and Herzegovina

Mass media in Maglaj
Television stations in Bosnia and Herzegovina
Television channels and stations established in 1992